MS Queen Anne is a cruise ship under construction for Cunard Line.

History 
In 2017, Cunard announced the order of fourth ship in their current fleet and the 249th ship in its history. It was initially announced that the new vessel will be based on the MS Koningsdam, Holland America Line's Pinnacle-class ship. With a gross tonnage of 113,000, the ship will carry up to 3,000 passengers.

In June 2019 Cunard announced the design team for the public spaces. Steel cutting began at Fincantieri’s Castellammare di Stabia shipyard on 11 October 2019.
Forward stub transferred to Marghera August 2022 for completion.

Media agencies initially speculated whether the ship's name would continue with Cunard's practice of naming them after queens or return to its 20th century convention of giving their vessels names ending in -'ia' like past Cunard ships RMS Aquitania, RMS Berengaria, RMS Caronia and RMS Mauretania. In February 2022, Cunard announced that the ship would be named Queen Anne. The ship's maiden voyage is scheduled for May 2024.

References

External links 
Official website

 

Proposed ships
Ships built by Fincantieri
Ships of the Cunard Line